Starczanowo may refer to:

Starczanowo, Poznań County, Poland
Starczanowo, Września County, Poland